The 1992 Missouri Valley Conference men's basketball tournament after the conclusion of the 1991–1992 regular season was played at the St. Louis Arena in St. Louis, Missouri.

Bracket

References

1991–92 Missouri Valley Conference men's basketball season
Missouri Valley Conference men's basketball tournament
Missouri Valley Conference men's basketball tournament
College basketball tournaments in Missouri
Basketball competitions in St. Louis